Joanna Sternberg is a singer, songwriter, visual artist and multi-instrumentalist based in New York City. Sternberg has released one full-length album, Then I Try Some More on Fat Possum Records,.. Sternberg went on their first tour opening for Conor Oberst in North America in July 2018.  Sternberg identifies as gender neutral and uses singular they/them pronouns.

Discography
Studio albums
Then I Try Some More (2019, Fat Possum Records)
Track listing (all songs written by Joanna Sternberg)

I’ve Got Me (2023, Fat Possum Records)
Track listing (all songs written by Joanna Sternberg)

References

External links
Joanna Sternberg Album Review by James Rettig in Stereogum

Joanna Sternberg song in NPR All Songs Considered

Joanna Sternberg tour announcement opening for Connor Oberst in Brooklyn Vegan 

Living people
Year of birth missing (living people)
Non-binary musicians
Fat Possum Records artists